Afitti is an ethnic group in North Kurdufan in Sudan. Afitti is a language of fewer than 10,000 speakers. It belongs to the  Nilo-Saharan languages. Nyimang is a related language. Afitti live in the Nuba Hills. Most members of this group are Muslims.

Ethnic groups in Sudan